Yevgeni Anatolyevich Plotnikov (born 6 September 1972) is a Russian professional football coach and a former player.

Club career
He played 3 games in the UEFA Champions League 1992–93 for PFC CSKA Moscow.

Honours
 Russian Cup finalist: 1993, 1994, 1999.

References

External links
 

1972 births
Sportspeople from Krasnodar
Living people
Soviet footballers
Soviet Union under-21 international footballers
Russian footballers
Russia under-21 international footballers
Association football goalkeepers
Russian Premier League players
Russian expatriate footballers
Expatriate footballers in Spain
Expatriate footballers in Belarus
Expatriate footballers in Kazakhstan
Russian expatriate sportspeople in Kazakhstan
FC Kuban Krasnodar players
PFC CSKA Moscow players
Albacete Balompié players
FC Arsenal Tula players
FC Dynamo Moscow players
FC Amkar Perm players
FC Sokol Saratov players
FC Partizan Minsk players
FC Vityaz Podolsk players
FC Zhenis Astana players